= HD 130603 =

Double star in the constellation Boötes

Observation data Epoch J2000 Equinox J2000
| Constellation | Boötes |
- A
| Right ascension | 14^{h} 48^{m} 23.34433^{s} |
| Declination | +24° 22′ 00.7454″ |
- Apparent magnitude (V): 6.52
- B
| Right ascension | 14^{h} 48^{m} 23.47331^{s} |
| Declination | +24° 22′ 01.9720″ |
- Apparent magnitude (V): 7.42

Characteristics
- Spectral type: F8 IV-V
- U−B color index: +0.08
- B−V color index: +0.50

Astrometry
| Radial velocity (R_{v}) | −31.3 km/s |
| Absolute magnitude (M_{V}) | 1.51 |

A
| Proper motion (μ) | RA: −100.860 mas/yr Dec.: +56.815 mas/yr |
| Parallax (π) | 11.5080±0.0195 mas |
| Distance | 283.4 ± 0.5 ly (86.9 ± 0.1 pc) |

B
| Proper motion (μ) | RA: −98.616 mas/yr Dec.: +57.857 mas/yr |
| Parallax (π) | 11.0473±0.0879 mas |
| Distance | 295 ± 2 ly (90.5 ± 0.7 pc) |

Details

A
| Mass | 1.7 M_{☉} |
| Radius | 3.8 R_{☉} |
| Luminosity | 15 L_{☉} |
| Surface gravity (log g) | 3.52 cgs |
| Temperature | 6,264 K |
| Metallicity [Fe/H] | 0.03 dex |
| Age | 1.7 Gyr |

B
| Mass | 1.6 M_{☉} |
| Radius | 2.4 R_{☉} |
| Luminosity | 6.8 L_{☉} |
| Temperature | 6,104 K |

Other designations
- BD+24°2779, HD 130144, HIP 72412, HR 5524, SAO 83535

Database references
| SIMBAD | data |
- A
- B

HD 130603 is a double star in the northern constellation of Boötes. As of 2010.476, the components have an angular separation of 2.06″ along a position angle of 54.7°.
